Dukovany is a municipality and village in Třebíč District in the Vysočina Region of the Czech Republic. It has about 900 inhabitants. It is known for the Dukovany Nuclear Power Station.

Geography

It lies in the Jevišovice Uplands. The village lies on the Dukovanský Stream, which flows into the Jihlava River. The Jihlava and the Mohelno Reservoir built on form the northern municipal border.

History
The first written mention of Dukovany is from 1263, originally named Tokovany. In the second half of the 13th century it was given to the Templar Order. In 1298, Alšík of Dukovany was mentioned as the owner of the nearby Rabštejn Castle.

In 1325, King John of Bohemia sold the settlement to Jindřich of Lipá, which indicates that the Dukovany family had died out at that time. The property belonged to the castle of Rabštejn. After its capture and destruction in 1446 it became a part of the king's domain. Later on, the village was added to the Moravský Krumlov estate, which belonged to the lords of Lipá. At the end of the 16th century, Dukovany became an independent estate which changed owners rather often.

Since the 1970s the built-up area has been rearranged and replaced by family residences, with the construction focusing on the downhill area below Dukovany chateau. In 1974–1987, a nuclear power station was constructed with a northern by-pass road and housing area for about 1,500 workers, which was the reason for demolishing the villages of Skryje, Heřmanice, and Lipany.

Demographics

Economy

Dukovany Nuclear Power Station, one of the two Czech nuclear power plants, is located in the municipality.

Sights
The Church of Saint Wenceslaus is the landmark of the village. It was built by the Templars and consecrated in 1279. In the 17th century it was baroque modified. In the 1970s, remnants of splendid fresco decorations from the 13th century were uncovered and restored.

The original manor house was turned into a late Baroque castle with Neoclassical elements in 1790. Its two large halls are decorated with frescoes by the important Moravian late baroque painter Josef Winterhalder. A large English park is also a part of the castle premises.

Rabštejn Castle has unclear origin and date of construction. In the 15th century, it was destroyed, and in 1486, it is already mentioned as a ruin. Only few fragments has been preserved. The ruin of the castle is freely accessible.

Gallery

References

External links

Villages in Třebíč District